Michael J. Slattery (November 26, 1866 – October 16, 1904) was an American professional baseball player. He played five seasons in Major League Baseball between 1884 and 1891 for the Boston Reds, New York Giants (NL), New York Giants (PL), Cincinnati Reds, and Washington Statesmen, primarily as an outfielder.

External links

1866 births
1904 deaths
19th-century baseball players
Major League Baseball outfielders
Boston Reds (UA) players
New York Giants (NL) players
New York Giants (PL) players
Cincinnati Reds players
Washington Statesmen players
Newburyport Clamdiggers players
Haverhill (minor league baseball) players
Toronto Canucks players
Binghamton Bingos players
Binghamton Bingoes players
Providence Clamdiggers (baseball) players
Wilkes-Barre Coal Barons players
Worcester (minor league baseball) players
Lewiston (minor league baseball) players
Bangor Millionaires players
Brockton Shoemakers players
Baseball players from Boston